The Isla del Congreso (in English: Congress Island) is an island located in the Chafarinas Islands, an archipelago located 4 kilometers from the African shore. The island belongs to Spain, and has an area of 0.256 km2.

Geography 
The island is uninhabited. It has some rabbits and a pigeon colony. The west coast is very inaccessible, with very steep cliffs, while the east coast is more accessible. The island is very rocky, with very little grass or plants. There is one navigable cave.

References

Plazas de soberanía
Uninhabited islands of Spain
Congreso